Aplotarsus incanus is a species of click beetles native to Europe.

Description
This beetle has a linear, elongated and convex brown-black body.  Its appendages are also brownish-black.

References

Elateridae
Beetles described in 1827
Beetles of Europe